South Arm may refer to:

South Arm Township, Michigan
South Arm, Tasmania

See also 
 South Armagh (disambiguation)